Hei Hei is a suburb of Christchurch, New Zealand. It is located in the west of Christchurch  from the central city, and is bisected by State Highway 1. The area was subdivided for poultry farming after World War I for returning serviceman, but the venture failed due to the poor soil conditions. The place name is related to the Māori word for chicken (heihei) due to the area's poultry farming history.

Demographics

Hei Hei had a population of 3,471 at the 2018 New Zealand census, an increase of 81 people (2.4%) since the 2013 census, and an increase of 357 people (11.5%) since the 2006 census. There were 1,182 households. There were 1,794 males and 1,677 females, giving a sex ratio of 1.07 males per female. The median age was 34.4 years (compared with 37.4 years nationally), with 696 people (20.1%) aged under 15 years, 774 (22.3%) aged 15 to 29, 1,632 (47.0%) aged 30 to 64, and 372 (10.7%) aged 65 or older.

Ethnicities were 67.8% European/Pākehā, 14.4% Māori, 9.6% Pacific peoples, 18.2% Asian, and 3.8% other ethnicities (totals add to more than 100% since people could identify with multiple ethnicities).

The proportion of people born overseas was 25.4%, compared with 27.1% nationally.

Although some people objected to giving their religion, 49.4% had no religion, 35.5% were Christian, 1.8% were Hindu, 1.0% were Muslim, 0.9% were Buddhist and 3.8% had other religions.

Of those at least 15 years old, 354 (12.8%) people had a bachelor or higher degree, and 693 (25.0%) people had no formal qualifications. The median income was $32,400, compared with $31,800 nationally. The employment status of those at least 15 was that 1,563 (56.3%) people were employed full-time, 330 (11.9%) were part-time, and 123 (4.4%) were unemployed.

Education
Gilberthorpe School is a contributing primary school catering for years 1 to 6. The school opened in 1957.

It opened in 1962.

Both schools are coeducational. Rolls are as of

References

Suburbs of Christchurch